Clive Morton (16 March 1904 – 24 September 1975) was an English actor best known for playing upper class Englishmen, he made many screen appearances, especially on television. In 1955, he appeared in Laurence Olivier's Richard III and is recalled by fans of Doctor Who for his role as prison governor George Trenchard in The Sea Devils in 1972. He played Commander Julius Rogue in the first series of the fondly-remembered children's TV series Rogue's Rock in 1974. One of his last roles was as an aged butler in an episode of Upstairs Downstairs.

Morton was also a Shakespearian actor and an Associate Artiste of the Royal Shakespeare Company. In the 1964 'Histories' Repertoire he played the Bishop of Carlisle in Richard II, the Earl of Worcester in Henry IV and the ferocious Earl of Talbot in Henry VI.

Morton was married to Fresh Fields actress Fanny Rowe. They acted together on stage in the 1955 J.B. Priestley play Mr. Kettle and Mrs. Moon.

Selected filmography

 The Last Coupon (1932) – (uncredited)
 The Secret of the Loch (1934) – Reporter / Photographer in Pub (uncredited)
 The Man Who Changed His Mind (1936) – Journalist (uncredited)
 Dead Men Tell No Tales (1939) – Frank Fielding
 While the Sun Shines (1947) – Guide
 Jassy (1947) – Sir William Fennell
 Mine Own Executioner (1947) – Robert Paston
 This Was a Woman (1948) – Company Director
 Bond Street (1948) – Bank Manager (uncredited)
 The Blind Goddess (1948) – Mersel
 Quartet (1948) – Henry Blane (segment "The Colonel's Lady")
 Here Come the Huggetts (1948) – Mr. Campbell
 Scott of the Antarctic (1948) – Herbert Ponting F.R.P.S.
 Vote for Huggett (1949) – Mr. Campbell
 The Huggetts Abroad (1949) – Campbell (uncredited)
 Kind Hearts and Coronets (1949) – The Prison Governor
 A Run for Your Money (1949) – Editor
 The Blue Lamp (1950) – Police Sgt. Brooks
 Trio (1950) – Ship's Captain (in segment Mr. Know-All)
 Traveller's Joy (1950) – Svensen
 Night Without Stars (1951) – Dr. Coulson
 The Lavender Hill Mob (1951) – Station Sergeant
 His Excellency (1952) – The G.O.C.
 Castle in the Air (1952) – MacFee
 Turn the Key Softly (1953) – Walters
 Carrington V.C. (1954) – Lt. Col. Huxford
 The Harassed Hero (1954) – Archer
 Orders Are Orders (1955) – Lt. Gen. Sir Cuthbert Grahame Foxe
 Richard III (1955) – The Lord Rivers
 Beyond Mombasa (1956) – Irate Man
 Seven Waves Away (1957) – Maj. Gen. Barrington
 After the Ball (1957) – Henry de Frece
 Lucky Jim (1957) – Sir Hector Gore-Urquhart
 The Safecracker (1958) – Sir George Turvey
 The Duke Wore Jeans (1958) – Lord Edward Whitecliffe
 The Moonraker (1958) – Lord Harcourt
 Next to No Time (1958) – Wallis
 The Navy Lark (1959) – Rear Admiral
 Make Mine a Million (1959) – National TV director general
 Shake Hands with the Devil (1959) – Sir Arnold Fielding
 The Pure Hell of St Trinian's (1960) – V.I.P.
 The Clue of the New Pin (1961) – Ramsey Brown
 A Matter of WHO (1961) – Hatfield
 I Thank a Fool (1962) – Judge
 Lawrence of Arabia (1962) – Artillery General at Field Briefing (uncredited)
 The Alphabet Murders (1965) – 'X'
 Stranger in the House (1967) – Col. Flower
 Star! (1968) – Army Officer Outside Window (uncredited)
 Lock Up Your Daughters (1969) – Bowsell
 Goodbye, Mr. Chips (1969) – General Paunceforth
 Jane Eyre (1970) – Mr. Eshton
 Zeppelin (1971) – Lord Delford
 Young Winston (1972) – Dr. Roose
 11 Harrowhouse (1974) – Sir Harold the Chairman

References

External links

English male film actors
English male television actors
1904 births
1975 deaths
20th-century English male actors
British male comedy actors